The 1973–74 season was Manchester City's 72nd season of competitive football and 54th season in the top division of English football. In addition to the First Division, the club competed in the FA Cup, Football League Cup and the FA Charity Shield.

First Division

League table

Results summary

References

External links

Manchester City F.C. seasons
Manchester City